The 1964 Kentucky Wildcats football team represented the University of Kentucky in the Southeastern Conference during the 1964 NCAA University Division football season. The Wildcats scored 150 points while allowing 194 points, finishing 5–5 overall, 3–3 in the SEC.

Season

Jim Foley and Bill Jenkins were chosen as team captains.

Kentucky opened with a 13–6 win against Detroit, then upset #1 ranked Ole Miss on the road, 27–21.  A 20–0 victory against #7 ranked Auburn followed. A 48–6 loss at Florida State put Kentucky at 3–1, though Kentucky was ranked #5 in the AP poll.

Next came a 27–7 loss to #9 LSU, followed by a 21–7 loss at Georgia and a 26–21 loss at West Virginia.  Kentucky rebounded to beat Vanderbilt 22–21; a 17–15 loss to Baylor was followed by a 12–7 win at Tennessee to close the season at 5–5.

Schedule

Team players in the 1965 NFL Draft

References

Kentucky
Kentucky Wildcats football seasons
Kentucky Wildcats football